Mark Hotchkis (born April 17, 1969) is an American former racing driver from Pasadena, California.

Racing career
After graduating from the Bob Bondurant School of High Performance Driving and the Elf-Winfield School first in class Hotchkis started competitive racing in karting in 1993. Hotchkis made his auto racing debut in 1993. In the regional Formula Dodge championships. Hotchkis won the Rookie of the Year title in the Western and Midwestern championships. The driver from Pasadena captured another five wins in the Eastern championship.

For 1994 Hotchkis graduated into the Barber Saab Pro Series. In his first race at Bicentennial Park in Miami Hotchkiss finished eleventh. Near the end of the season with three rounds to go Hotchkis was placed third in the championship. As Hotchkis won both races at Road America and placed second in the season finale at Phoenix International Raceway the American beat Juan Pablo Montoya for the second place in the standings. The following year Hotchkis moved into Indy Lights, finishing 7th in points. He captured his first win the following year from the pole at the Milwaukee Mile and finished a career best 5th in points. He drove for Team Green in 1997 but failed to win and again finished 7th in points. He competed part-time in 1998 and won his final Indy Lights race, the season finale at California Speedway.

Personal life
Hotchkis is an alumnus of Chapman University where he studied legal studies. Hotchkis is now involved with his brother John's company, Hotchkis Sport Suspension, which designs and markets high performance suspension systems for classic muscle cars. Mark and John also own a classic Porsche 962 race car that they campaign in various vintage races.

He is married with two children.

Racing record

American open-wheel racing results
(key) (Races in bold indicate pole position) (Races in italics indicate fastest lap)

Indy Lights

SCCA National Championship Runoffs

References

External links

Mark Hotchkis Indy Lights results at ChampCarStats.com

1969 births
Indy Lights drivers
Living people
24 Hours of Daytona drivers
Rolex Sports Car Series drivers
Sportspeople from Pasadena, California
Racing drivers from California
Barber Pro Series drivers
SCCA National Championship Runoffs winners

Andretti Autosport drivers